Gay Lea Foods Co-operative Limited is a dairy products co-operative in Canada producing butter, sour cream, cottage cheese, whipped cream and lactose free milk for retail, foodservice, industrial and export markets. Gay Lea also produces a new product called "Spreadables", which is a spreadable butter, made as a canola oil and butter blend, that tastes like butter but is spreadable directly out of the fridge. The company is based in Mississauga, Ontario and owned and operated by Ontario milk producers, currently representing approximately thirty-five per cent of all Ontario dairy farms.

History
The company was founded in 1958 as United Dairy and Poultry Co-operative Limited and later renamed Gay Lea Foods Co-operative Limited, to reflect the brand name of its products.

In 1981, Gay Lea purchased the 106-year-old Teeswater Creamery.

In October 2016, Gay Lea acquired Canadian butter maker Stirling Creamery

Operations
 Mississauga, Ontario - Head Office.
 Weston, Ontario - Main distribution centre and cultured products plant.
 Weston, Ontario - UHT pasteurized milk and cream processing plant.
 Guelph, Ontario - Milk powder processing plant, creamery, spreadable butter and aerosol whipped topping operations.
 Teeswater, Ontario - Milk and cream collection plant, milk powder processing creamery and retail outlet.
 Ivanhoe, Ontario - Traditional Canadian cheeses for both retail and ingredients applications.  Ivanhoe also has a retail outlet.
 Hamilton, Ontario - Salerno Cheese - combined with a retail outlet and fine, traditional Italian Cheeses.
 Hagersville, Ontario - Organic Dairy and goat milk products - combined with the famous Dairy Bar
 Brampton, Ontario - Head DC for all plants.
 Lindsay, Ontario - 10% stake on Mariposa Dairy - specializing in goat cheese.

Products
 Nordica Cottage cheese
 Nordica Single Serve Cottage cheese
 Lacteeze Milk
 Gay Lea Spreadable Butter Blend
 Gay Lea Butter
 Gay Lea Sour Cream
 Gay Lea Sour Cream Dip
 Gay Lea Real Whipped Cream
 Western Dairy products

References

External links
 Official website

Dairy products companies of Canada
Agricultural cooperatives in Canada
Food and drink companies established in 1958
1958 establishments in Ontario
Worker cooperatives of Canada